Lee Jae-hee (Korean: 이재희; born April 15, 1959) is a former South Korean footballer who played as a defender. 

He started professional career at Daewoo Rolyas in 1983.

He was selected in the K League Best XI for the 1990 K League season.

References

External links 
 

1959 births
Living people
Association football midfielders
South Korean footballers
Busan IPark players
Kyung Hee University alumni